Rustenburg Girls' High School and Rustenburg Girls' Junior School are two separate public schools with a shared history, originating in the suburb of Rondebosch in Cape Town, South Africa. Rustenburg was founded in 1894 and divided into separate junior and high schools in 1932.

History 

The school was founded in 1894 in the historic Rustenburg House, which dates from the early years of the Dutch settlement at the Cape  In 1932, the school was divided into two schools, and the high school moved into its new buildings on Erinville Estate and Charlie's Hope in the suburb of Rosebank, while the junior school remained in Rustenburg House on Main Road, Rondebosch. Charlie's Hope was subsequently demolished in 1976, before being rebuilt closer to the school. Erinville is now the name of the High School's boarding house. Rustenburg House was declared a National Monument in 1941.  

Headmistresses of the Combined School:
 Miss Alicia Bleby, 1894–1911
 Miss Jean Donaldson-Wright, 1912–1916
 Miss Caroline Kemp, 1916–1933
Principals of the High School:
 Miss Caroline Kemp, 1933–1936
 Miss Gwen Hazell, 1937–1951
 Miss Margaret Thomson, 1952–1979
 Mrs Josephine McIntyre, 1980–1991
 Mrs Mary van Blerk, 1991–1999
 Dr Elizabeth Fullard, 1999–2006
 Mrs Susan Schnetler (Acting),  2006-2007
 Ms Laura Bekker, 2007–2015
 Mrs Susan Schnetler (Acting), 2016 
 Mr Michael Gates, 2017–present
Headmistresses of the Junior School:
 Miss Marion Roper, 1933–1944
 Miss Zoë Orton, 1945–1967
 Mrs Ruth Jones, 1968–1977
 Miss Hazel Lentin, 1978–1998
 Mrs Joyce Conway, 1998–2007
 Mrs Di Berry, 2008–2018
 Mrs Belinda Peterson, 2019–present

Academics 

In 2010, Rustenberg Girls' High School was placed third in a list of the top schools in the Western Cape after placing sixth in 2009.

A 2013 survey by Fairlady magazine listed Rustenburg Girls' High School among the top 25 schools in the country.

In 2014, Rustenburg Girls' High School again qualified for inclusion in the official top 20 schools list and was placed sixth.

In 2015, the Western Cape Education Department stopped ranking the top schools in order of their performance and instead listed them alphabetically. In this year, Rustenburg Girls' High School was included in the list of the top 22 schools.

In 2019, a Grade 7 student at Rustenberg Girls' Junior School came first in the Western Cape at the Horizon Maths Competition.

In 2023, a matriculant from Rustenberg Girls' High School was honoured as the country's top candidate overall as well as in Maths.

Sport 

Rustenburg has historically been well represented in South African and Western Province teams. In 2012, two girls represented South Africa in tennis and artistic gymnastics, while two staff members represented South Africa in sevens rugby and triathlon.

The high school has nine tennis/netball courts, a swimming pool and two hockey/cricket fields. An astroturf playing field was installed during 2014 with floodlights added in 2016 .

The following sports are offered by Rustenburg Girls' High School: cricket, cross-country, hockey, indoor hockey, netball, running, football, squash, swimming, tennis, touch rugby, waterpolo .

Music 
The highly acclaimed High School Music Department features an Orchestra, Choir, Chamber Choir, Jazz Band, Wind Band, String Quartet, Vocal Quartet, String Ensemble and Savuyisa (Marimba Band) .

Notable Old Girls 

 Frances Ames,  neurologist, psychiatrist, and human rights activist
Jodi Balfour, film and television actress
 Louise Carver, singer
Janette Deacon, archaeologist 
 Mabel Malherbe, South African politician
 Debora Patta, broadcast journalist and television producer
 Leila Reitz, the first woman elected to South Africa's parliament
 Edith Layard Stephens, botanist
 Désirée Talbot, opera singer
Marjorie van Heerden, book illustrator
 Pauline Vogelpoel MBE, late director of the Contemporary Art Society and member of the International Council of the Tate Gallery
 Elizabeth Voigt, late director of the McGregor Museum in Kimberley

In popular culture
Scenes in the films Spud 2: The Madness Continues and Spud 3: Learning to Fly were shot at the school.

See also 
List of primary schools in South Africa
List of High Schools in South Africa

References

Rondebosch
Boarding schools in South Africa
Schools in Cape Town
Educational institutions established in 1894
Girls' schools in South Africa
1894 establishments in the Cape Colony